Lucas Raymond (born 28 March 2002) is a Swedish ice hockey winger for the Detroit Red Wings of the National Hockey League (NHL). He was selected fourth overall by the Red Wings in the 2020 NHL Entry Draft.

Playing career
On 4 October 2018, Raymond made his Swedish Hockey League (SHL) debut with Frölunda HC. In doing so, he became the first player born in 2002 to play in the SHL. Later that season on 28 December 2018, he scored his first professional goal against Skellefteå AIK, at the age of 16.

On 17 April 2021, Raymond was signed by the Detroit Red Wings to a three-year entry-level contract.

In his first North American season, Raymond made the Red Wings opening night roster to begin the 2021–22 season. On 19 October 2021, Raymond scored his first NHL goal on Joonas Korpisalo of the Columbus Blue Jackets, helping the Red Wings to a 4–1 victory. On 24 October Raymond scored his first career NHL hat trick against Marc-André Fleury and posted a career-best four points in a 6–3 victory over the Chicago Blackhawks. Raymond was named the NHL Rookie of the Month for November 2021 after recording 12 points in 14 games.

Personal life
His father Jean was born in France and moved to Sweden at the age of 15. He has an older brother named Hugo.

Career statistics

Regular season and playoffs

International

Awards and honors

References

External links
 

2002 births
Living people
Detroit Red Wings draft picks
Detroit Red Wings players
Frölunda HC players
National Hockey League first-round draft picks
Ice hockey people from Gothenburg
Swedish ice hockey forwards